This is a list of the mammal species recorded in São Tomé and Príncipe. These are the native terrestrial and naturally occurring marine mammal species in São Tomé and Príncipe, of which two are critically endangered, one is endangered, and two are near threatened. In addition, six species of terrestrial mammal have been introduced to the islands, and eight domestic species have become feral or otherwise pose a threat to the native fauna.

The following tags are used to highlight each species' conservation status as assessed by the International Union for Conservation of Nature:

Some species were assessed using an earlier set of criteria. Species assessed using this system have the following instead of near threatened and least concern categories:

Order: Rodentia 

Family: Muridae
Subfamily: Murinae
Genus: Mus
House mouse, Mus musculus (introduced) 
Genus: Rattus
Common rat, Rattus norvegicus (introduced) 
Ship rat, Rattus rattus (introduced)

Order: Primates 

The order Primates contains humans and their closest relatives: lemurs, lorisoids, tarsiers, monkeys, and apes.

Suborder: Haplorhini
Infraorder: Simiiformes
Parvorder: Catarrhini
Superfamily: Cercopithecoidea
Family: Cercopithecidae (Old World monkeys)
Genus: Cercopithecus
 Mona monkey, C. mona  introduced

Order: Soricomorpha (shrews, moles, and solenodons) 

The "shrew-forms" are insectivorous mammals. The shrews and solenodons closely resemble mice, while the moles are stout-bodied burrowers.

Family: Soricidae (shrews)
Subfamily: Crocidurinae
Genus: Crocidura
 Fraser's musk shrew, Crocidura poensis 
 São Tomé shrew, Crocidura thomensis

Order: Chiroptera (bats) 

The bats' most distinguishing feature is that their forelimbs are developed as wings, making them the only mammals capable of flight. Bat species account for about 20% of all mammals.

Family: Pteropodidae (flying foxes, Old World fruit bats)
Subfamily: Pteropodinae
Genus: Eidolon
 Straw-coloured fruit bat, Eidolon helvum 
Genus: Myonycteris
 São Tomé collared fruit bat, Myonycteris brachycephala 
Genus: Rousettus
 Egyptian fruit bat, Rousettus aegyptiacus 
Family: Vespertilionidae
Subfamily: Miniopterinae
Genus: Miniopterus
 Least long-fingered bat, Miniopterus minor 
Family: Molossidae
Genus: Chaerephon
 Little free-tailed bat, Chaerephon pumila 
 São Tomé free-tailed bat, Chaerephon tomensis 
Family: Emballonuridae
Genus: Taphozous
 Mauritian tomb bat, Taphozous mauritianus 
Family: Rhinolophidae
Subfamily: Hipposiderinae
Genus: Hipposideros
 Noack's roundleaf bat, Hipposideros ruber 
 Saõ Tomé leaf-nosed bat, Hipposideros thomensis

Order: Carnivora 

Family: Viverridae
Subfamily: Viverrinae
Genus: Civettictis
 African civet, Civettictis civetta (introduced) 
Family: Mustelidae
Subfamily: Mustelinae
Genus: Mustela
 Least weasel, Mustela nivalis (introduced)

Order: Cetacea (whales) 

The order Cetacea includes whales, dolphins and porpoises. They are the mammals most fully adapted to aquatic life with a spindle-shaped nearly hairless body, protected by a thick layer of blubber, and forelimbs and tail modified to provide propulsion underwater.

Suborder: Mysticeti
Family: Balaenopteridae
Subfamily: Balaenopterinae
Genus: Balaenoptera
 Common minke whale, Balaenoptera acutorostrata 
 Antarctic minke whale, Balaenoptera bonaerensis 
 Sei whale, Balaenoptera borealis 
 Bryde's whale, Balaenoptera edeni 
 Blue whale, Balaenoptera musculus 
 Fin whale, Balaenoptera physalus 
Subfamily: Megapterinae
Genus: Megaptera
 Humpback whale, Megaptera novaeangliae 
Suborder: Odontoceti
Superfamily: Platanistoidea
Family: Physeteridae
Genus: Physeter
 Sperm whale, Physeter macrocephalus 
Family: Kogiidae
Genus: Kogia
 Pygmy sperm whale, Kogia breviceps 
 Dwarf sperm whale, Kogia sima 
Family: Ziphidae
Subfamily: Hyperoodontinae
Genus: Mesoplodon
 Blainville's beaked whale, Mesoplodon densirostris 
 Gervais' beaked whale, Mesoplodon europaeus 
Genus: Ziphius
 Cuvier's beaked whale, Ziphius cavirostris 
Family: Delphinidae (marine dolphins)
Genus: Steno
 Rough-toothed dolphin, Steno bredanensis 
Genus: Tursiops
 Common bottlenose dolphin, Tursiops truncatus 
Genus: Delphinus
 Long-beaked common dolphin, Delphinus capensis 
Genus: Stenella
 Pantropical spotted dolphin, Stenella attenuata 
 Striped dolphin, Stenella coeruleoalba 
 Atlantic spotted dolphin, Stenella frontalis 
 Clymene dolphin, Stenella clymene 
 Spinner dolphin, Stenella longirostris 
Genus: Lagenodelphis
 Fraser's dolphin, Lagenodelphis hosei 
Genus: Sousa
 Atlantic humpback dolphin, Sousa teuszii 
Genus: Orcinus
 Orca, Orcinus orca 
Genus: Feresa
 Pygmy killer whale, Feresa attenuata 
Genus: Pseudorca
 False killer whale, Pseudorca crassidens 
Genus: Globicephala
 Short-finned pilot whale, Globicephala macrorhynchus 
Genus: Peponocephala
 Melon-headed whale, Peponocephala electra

Notes

References

See also
List of chordate orders
Lists of mammals by region
List of prehistoric mammals
Mammal classification
List of mammals described in the 2000s

Sao Tome and Principe
Sao Tome and Principe
mammals
'